Relations between the United States and the Uruguay traditionally have been based on a common outlook and emphasis on democratic ideals.

History 
In historical perspective, starting in the 1890s Uruguay took the lead in reaching out to the U.S. in order to counter the heavy British business presence. The U.S. responded in friendly fashion. Knarr argues:
The United States did not need to coerce Uruguay economically, politically, or militarily to achieve its goals; Uruguay was a friendly and stable nation that the United States could use as an economic and political gateway into the Southern Cone.

In 2002, The United States and Uruguay  created a Joint Commission on Trade and Investment (JCTI) to exchange ideas on a variety of economic topics. In March 2003, the JCTI identified six areas of concentration until the eventual signing of the Free Trade Area of the Americas (FTAA): customs issues, intellectual property protection, investment, labor, environment, and trade in goods. In late 2004, the United States and Uruguay signed an Open Skies Agreement, which was ratified in May 2006. In November 2005, they signed a Bilateral Investment Treaty (BIT), which entered into force on November 1, 2006. A Trade and Investment Framework Agreement (TIFA) was signed in January 2007. More than 80 U.S.-owned companies operate in Uruguay, and many more market U.S. goods and services.

Uruguay cooperates with the U.S. on law enforcement matters such as regional efforts to fight drug trafficking and terrorism. It has also been very active in human rights issues.

From 1999 through early 2003, Uruguayan citizens were exempted from visas when entering the United States under the Visa Waiver Program. This exemption was withdrawn on April 16, 2003, based on the high overstay rates for Uruguayans and worldwide national security concerns.

Under Tabaré Vázquez, President of Uruguay from 2005 to 2010 and 2015 to 2020, Uruguay has taken positions on a number of issues which are very markedly different from those of the United States. However, under his right-wing successor, president Luis Lacalle Pou, since 2020, United States-Uruguay relations have again improved and strengthened. Nevertheless, Vázquez sought the help of President George W Bush in the face of the crisis with Argentina around the Uruguay River pulp mill dispute.

According to the 2012 U.S. Global Leadership Report, 40% of Uruguayans approve of U.S. leadership, with 22% disapproving and 38% uncertain.

Principal U.S. Embassy officials
 Chargé d'Affaires--Karl Ríos

Principal Uruguayan Embassy officials
 Ambassador--Andrés Durán Hareau

Resident diplomatic missions
 United States has an embassy in Montevideo.
 Uruguay has an embassy in Washington, D.C. and has consulates-general in Chicago, Miami, New York City and San Francisco.

Country comparison

See also
 Americans in Uruguay
 Uruguayan Americans
 Tabaré Vázquez#2008 Visit to Cuba
 Tabaré Vázquez#Arms from Iran controversy
 Tabaré Vázquez#Support for delisting coca as a dangerous drug & relations with Bolivia
 United States involvement in regime change in Latin America

References

Further reading
 Knarr, James C.  Uruguay and the United States, 1903-1929: Diplomacy in the Progressive Era. (Kent State University Press; 2012) online review
 Spear, Jane E. "Uruguayan Americans." Gale Encyclopedia of Multicultural America, edited by Thomas Riggs, (3rd ed., vol. 4, Gale, 2014), pp. 475–483. online
 Whitaker, Arthur P. The United States and the southern cone: Argentina, Chile, and Uruguay (1976) online

External links

 History of Uruguay - U.S. relations
  Uruguayan-American Foundation (UAF)

 
Uruguay
United States